Dannemann Cigars (Dannemann Cigarrenfabrik in German) was founded by Gerhard Dannemann. He was born on 23 April 1851 in Bremen and died in 1921. A German-Brazilian entrepreneur and founder of the cigar company Dannemann, he later changed his name to Geraldo Dannemann. Dannemann also makes the famous cigarillo brand Moods.

History 
The company was founded by Bremen-born entrepreneur Geraldo Dannemann, who emigrated to Brazil in 1872 at the age of 21. In 1873, he opened a cigar factory in the small town of São Félix. He had always been in contact with cigars during his childhood, so he recognized the potential there. First he started with six employees to grow the tobacco, shape the cigars and export them to Europe. From 1910 it increased to about 4000 employees at seven factory locations. This made him one of the most important industrialists in the Brazilian state of Bahia.

In 1922 the Dannemann and Stender companies merged to form the Companhia de Charutos Dannemann.

The Second World War interrupted transatlantic trade because of the economic embargo and Dannemann was expropriated in Brazil and the company was run by the Brazilian bank Banco do Brasil.

After the war, Dannemann got his possessions back in Brazil. In 1954, he had to file for bankruptcy.

In the period that followed, the Dannemann brand belonged to the Minden-based Melitta group of companies before it was sold.

The rights to the Dannemann brand were sold to Liechtenstein. The German Dannemann GmbH and the Swiss company Burger Söhne shared the rights to use the brand. In 1988, the Burger Group bought the German trademark rights for Dannemann and took over Dannemann GmbH in Lübbecke. The brand has been in one hand ever since.

After reunification, another production site was opened in Treffurt.

Since the 1980s, the products have been further developed, so the metal can for carrying in the bag and better packaging for freshness were introduced. In 1994, the flavored cigarillo, the Dannemann Moods, was launched, followed by a variant as a filter cigarillo.

Based on the Centro Cultural Dannemann in Bahia, Brazil, the Centro Dannemann was founded in Brissago, Switzerland at the beginning of 2002.

The Dannemann Group is today (2011) one of the most traditional European tobacco companies and market leader in Germany in the field of cigarillos and cigars.

In popular culture
Dannemann cigars are mentioned in the Cold Chisel song Cheap Wine.

References

External links
 List of known Dannemann cigars

Cigar brands
Tobacco companies of Germany